Miss India Worldwide 1997 was the seventh edition of the international beauty pageant. The final was held in Mumbai, India on  November 7, 1997. About 15 countries were represented in the pageant. Poonam Chibber  of Canada was crowned as winner at the end of the event.

Results

Special awards

Delegates
 – Poonam Chibber
 – Bibi Naema Khan
 – Shruti Nambiar
 – Sumera Peerbhoy
 – Shanti Tolani
 – Magaswari Subermaniam
 – Rishma Soedhoe
 – Jeymani Atthiappan
 – Arvasini Persad
 – Rosana Mahawatkhan
 – Anjali Keshava
 – Nalini Ramrattan
 – Anupama Jaidka
 – Priya Darshini Ayyar
 – Sangita Patel

References

External links
http://www.worldwidepageants.com/

1997 beauty pageants